The Shinfox Energy Co., Ltd. is an energy company of Taiwan.

History
Shinfox was established on 27 April 2007.

Transportation
The company headquarter office is accessible within walking distance north east from Dingpu Station of Taipei Metro.

See also

 Electricity sector in Taiwan
 List of companies of Taiwan

References

External links
 

2007 establishments in Taiwan
Companies based in New Taipei
Energy companies established in 2007
Energy companies of Taiwan